Digne may refer to:
 Digne-les-Bains, commune in the departement of Alpes-de-Haute-Provence, France
 La Digne-d'Amont, commune in the departement of Aude, France
 La Digne-d'Aval, commune in the departement of Aude, France
 Roman Catholic Diocese of Digne, Roman Catholic Diocese of Digne-les-Bains
 Lucas Digne, French football player
 10088 Digne, asteroid

See also 
 Digne-les-Bains (disambiguation)